Alex Brown (born 28 August 1987) is a Jamaica international rugby league footballer who plays on the  for the Underbank Rangers

He made his first-grade début, playing Left- in the 10-12 defeat by St. Helens in 2009s Super League XIV at Knowsley Road, St. Helens on Friday 21 August 2009. He was "dual-registered" for 2010s Super League XV, with Co-operative Championship club Batley, which means he played on loan at Batley with the option of an immediate recall to Huddersfield.

Background
Brown was born in England, and is of Jamaican heritage.

Bradford Bulls
At the end of 2017, Brown signed a 1-year deal with League 1 side Bradford Bulls linking up with his former coach John Kear.

Representative career 
Brown played, and scored a try in Jamaica's 26-36 defeat by United States in the 2010 Atlantic Cup at Hodges Stadium, Jacksonville, Florida on Tuesday 16 November 2010. In 2015, Brown played for Jamaica in their 2017 Rugby League World Cup qualifiers.

References

External links
Search for "Alex Brown" at bbc.co.uk

1987 births
Living people
Batley Bulldogs players
Bradford Bulls players
Coventry Bears players
Dewsbury Rams players
English people of Jamaican descent
Jamaican rugby league players
English rugby league players
Halifax R.L.F.C. players
Huddersfield Giants players
Hull Kingston Rovers players
Jamaica national rugby league team players
Keighley Cougars players
Leigh Leopards players
Newcastle Thunder players
Rochdale Hornets players
Rugby league wingers
Widnes Vikings players